For the West Tampa Center for the Arts see Santaella Studios for the Arts

WTCA (1050 AM) is a radio station  broadcasting a classic hits format. Licensed to Plymouth, Indiana, United States.  The station is currently owned by Community Service Broadcasters.

References

External links

TCA